Flight 117 may refer to:

Air France Flight 117, crashed on 22 June 1962
Singapore Airlines Flight 117, hijacked on 26 March 1991

0117